The candlestick telephone (or pole telephone) is a style of telephone that was common from the late 1890s to the 1940s. A candlestick telephone is also often referred to as a desk stand, an upright, or a stick phone. Candlestick telephones featured a mouth piece (transmitter) mounted at the top of the stand, and a receiver (ear phone) that was held by the user to the ear during a call. When the telephone was not in use, the receiver rested in the fork of the switch hook protruding to the side of the stand, thereby disconnecting the audio circuit from the telephone network.

Design and features
Candlestick telephones were designed with varying features. At the top of the stand was mounted a  carbon microphone (transmitter) to speak into, and a switch hook extending sideways upon which an ear piece (receiver) was hung. To make or answer a telephone call, the user lifted the receiver off the switch hook, activating an internal switch connecting the telephone to the telephone line. Candlestick telephones required the nearby installation of a subscriber set (subset, ringer box), which housed the ringer to announce incoming calls and the electric circuitry (capacitor, induction coil, signaling generator, connection terminals) to connect the set to the telephone network. When automatic telephone exchanges were introduced, the base of a candlestick also featured a rotary dial, used for signaling the telephone number of the call recipient.

Production
Candlestick telephone models were produced by many manufacturers. The main producers of these telephones were Western Electric (a unit of AT&T), Automatic Electric Co. (later acquired by GTE), Kellogg Switchboard & Supply Company and Stromberg-Carlson. The first tube shaft candlestick telephone was the Western Electric #20B Desk Phone patented in 1904. In the 1920s and 1930s, telephone technology shifted to the design of more efficient desk top telephones that featured a handset with receiver and transmitter elements in one unit, making the use of a telephone more convenient. Despite ceasing new production, many candlestick telephones remained in operation, maintained by the telephone companies in the 1940s and into the 1950s. Many retro-style versions of the candlestick telephone were made, long after the original phones were obsolete, by companies such as  Radio Shack and the Crosley Radio company.

Successor telephones
When Western Electric had sufficiently developed modern handset design in the 1920s, the Western Electric candlesticks were superseded by a series of new desktop models, starting with the A1 handset mounting in 1927. The cradle contained a plunger that operated the hookswitch in the base below. The A1 was only distributed for a very short time until the B-type telephone mount was completed the same year, a streamlined design that replaced the tube-shaft with a sculpted cone shape. By 1930 this round base was redesigned into the elliptical-footprint D handset mounting to avoid instability of the unit when dialing. In the same period, the electric circuitry was upgraded to produce the model 202 telephone, which reduced the strong sidetone characteristic of earlier designs.

Accessories
The Hush-A-Phone was like a mini megaphone created in 1920 for slipping over the candlestick phone.

Later design influences
The Ericofon, or Cobra Phone is a plastic one-piece telephone, in the candlestick/upright style, created by the Ericsson Company and marketed throughout the second half of the 20th century. It was the first commercially marketed telephone design to incorporate the dial and headset into a single unit. Because of its styling, and influence on future telephone design, the Ericofon is considered one of the most significant industrial designs of the 20th century and is in the collection of Museum of Modern Art.

See also

References

External links

 History and Photos of Antique Phones
 Website supporting the Ericofon

Telephony equipment
Western Electric telephones